Mudio Mukutu Pierre Narcisse De Napoli De Suza, known as Pierre Narcisse (19 February 1977 — 21 June 2022), was a Cameroonian-born Russian singer.

Biography 
Born in Ebone, Cameroon in 1977, Narcisse played football as a child and learned to play saxophone at age 13. In the early 1990s, he created a group which performed music at nightclubs, both in the French language and local Cameroonian languages.

Narcisse moved to Yegoryevsk, where his sister lived and took part in the filming of The Barber of Siberia. He then attended the MSU Faculty of Journalism and played for the KVN team of the Peoples' Friendship University of Russia. In 2000, he participated in several episodes of the television show  on MTV Russia as a participant. In 2001, he appeared on a special edition of the show, replacing Yana Churikova. At the same time, he worked for the radio station Hit FM.

Narcisse recorded the song Chocolate Bunny for the television series Fabrika Zvyozd. In 2004, he released an album of the same name as his song. In 2006, he was awarded the title  Honored Artist of Ingushetia. In 2008, he participated in the Russia-1 show . In 2013, he recorded the singles The Domes and Sakhalin's Love alongside .

Pierre Narcisse died in Moscow on 21 June 2022 following a failed kidney surgery. His death was reported by his ex-wife Valeria Kalacheva and daughter Karolina-Kristel.

References

External links 
 

1977 births
2022 deaths
Russian male singers
Russian people of Cameroonian descent
Naturalised citizens of Russia
People from Yegoryevsky District, Moscow Oblast